Gunbir Singh Sidhu is an Indian movie producer. He did his schooling from Saint Stephen's School, Chandigarh &     
bachelors in technology from NIT Jalandhar and then went on to pursue his master's degree in electric engineering from Imperial College, London.

Career
After completing his master's degree, he returned to India in 2004. He began his career as a trader of used cars. After a while, he established multiple business like real estate, education, agriculture & finance.
Sidhu marked his debut into the film industry as the producer of blockbuster Punjabi film Jatt and Juliet in 2012 which was a massive success. 
He is the co owner of White Hill Production & White Hill Music with his brother and Partner Manmord(Sunny) Sidhu. He has produced some of the most successful Punjabi music videos.

Filmography
 Jatt & Juliet (Producer)
 Jatt & Juliet 2 (Producer)
 Tu Mera 22 Main Tera 22 (Producer)
 Best of Luck (Producer)
 Romeo Ranjha (Producer)
 Punjab 1984 (Producer)
 Sardaarji (Producer)
 Sardaarji 2 (Producer)
 Saab Bahadar (Producer)
 Channa Mereya (Producer)
 Carry on Jatta 2 (Producer)
 Muklawa (Producer)
 Ardab Mutiyaran 2019 (Producer)
 Lekh 2022 (Producer)
 Shareek 2 2022 (Producer)
 Jind Mahi 2022 (Producer)

Distribution
 Daddy Cool Munde Fool
 Jatts In Golmaal
 Jatt & Juliet 2
 Fer Mamla Gadbad Gadbad
 Best of Luck
 Young Malang
 Nabar
 Heer & Hero
 Ishq Garaari
 Patiala Dreams (2014)
 Control Bhaji Control (2014)
 Honour Killing (2014)
 Bhatinda Express (2014)

References

External links
 

Living people
Film producers from Punjab, India
1982 births